Damaskinos Papandreou is Greek name and surname that may refer to three different Orthodox Hierarches:
 Archbishop Damaskinos of Athens (1891-1949), was the Head of the Church of Greece as Archbishop of Athens and All Greece (1941-1949) and the Prime Minister of Greece (1945)
 Damaskinos (Papandreou) of Hadrianpolis (1936-2011), was the Hierarch of the Ecumenical Patriarchate of Constantinople
 Damaskinos (Papandreou) of Johannesburg (born 1957), is the Hierarch of the Greek Orthodox Church of Alexandria